Subaru uses a four or five character code to identify all of their engines. As of August 2022 these are the engines presently in models sold by Subaru
 FB20D: 1995 cc DOHC, 2017+ Subaru Impreza, and 2018+ Subaru Crosstrek
 FB25D: 2498 cc DOHC, 2019+ North American Subaru Forester, 2020+ North American Subaru Legacy, 2020+ North American Subaru Outback, and 2021+ North American Subaru Crosstrek
 FA24D: 2,387 cc DOHC, 2022+ Subaru BRZ/Toyota 86
 FA24F: 2,387 cc DOHC, turbo, 2019+ USDM Subaru Ascent, 2020+ Subaru Legacy, and 2020+ Subaru Outback. 2021+ USDM Subaru WRX
 CB18: 1795 cc DOHC, 2020 JDM Subaru Levorg, 2021 JDM Subaru Forester

Two-cylinder

Subaru EK engine 

The EK series was an inline twin cylinder engine. Early versions were air-cooled two-stroke cycle, later replaced with water-cooled configurations in 1971. The engine was upgraded to a four-stroke SOHC in 1973 to meet Japanese Government emission regulations, using the SEEC emissions system (later SEEC-T), with an alloy block and head.

The was used from 1958 until 1989 in most Kei car models.

Notes

Three-cylinder
The EF series engine is a liquid-cooled three-cylinder, four-stroke, with SOHC. It is not compliant with Japanese Government regulations concerning displacement of kei cars with a current maximum limit of 660 cc. The EF appeared while the EK was being replaced by the EN05.

Subaru EF engine
 EF10: Bore x Stroke mm = 78.0 x 69.6
Piston displacement = 997 cc
Compression ratio = 9.5:1
Two valves per cylinder
SOHC 2V, 55 hp at 5,200 rpm 1984–1987 Subaru Justy
 EF12:Bore x Stroke mm = 78.0 x 83.0
Piston displacement = 1189 cc
Compression ratio = 9.1:1
Three valves per cylinder
SOHC 3V, 66-73 hp 1987–1994 Subaru Justy

Four-cylinder
All of Subaru's four-cylinder engines (except the EN series) are liquid-cooled, horizontally opposed boxer four-strokes.

Subaru EA engine 
The EA was used from 1966 until 1994 in most models. It is a basic two-valve-per-cylinder design with siamese ports, or one port that is directly next to another, and three main crankshaft main bearings. Engines with overhead camshafts were installed with two timing belts, whereas vehicles with overhead valves used timing gears exclusively.

 EA52: 977 cc OHV, 55 hp at 6,000 rpm used in the 1966–1971 Subaru 1000
 EA61: 1088.8 cc OHV, 62 hp at 6,400 rpm used in the 1970–1972 Subaru FF-1 Star and Subaru G
 EA62: 1267.5 cc OHV, 80 hp at 6,400 rpm used in the 1971–1972 Subaru G
 EA63: 1362 cc OHV, 58 hp at 5,200 rpm used in the 1973–1976 Subaru Leone
 EA71: 1595 cc OHV, 67 hp at 5,200 rpm or 68 at 4,800 rpm used in the 1976–1987 Subaru Leone and 1978–1980 Subaru BRAT/brumby
 EA81: 1781 cc OHV, 73 hp at 4,800 rpm used in the 1980–1984 Subaru Leone and 1981–1993 Subaru BRAT/brumby
 EA81T: 1781 cc OHV Turbo, 95 hp at 4,200 rpm used in the 1983–1984 Subaru Leone and Subaru BRAT/brumby
 EA82: 1791 cc SOHC, 84-97 hp used in the Subaru Leone and Subaru XT
 EA82T: 1791 cc SOHC, 136 hp at 5200 rpm used in the Subaru Leone and Subaru XT

Subaru EE engine (diesel)

Subaru unveiled the world's first boxer diesel engine to be fitted in a passenger car at the Geneva Auto Show in 2007. The EE20 shares a bore pitch dimension and assembly line with the EZ30 at the Ooizumi Factory; compared to the contemporaneous gasoline EJ20, which has a similar displacement, the EE20 is  shorter.

The IHI variable geometry turbo is mounted under the right side of the engine, close to the exhaust manifold, reducing turbo lag. For the Legacy 2.0D, Subaru claimed consumption improved by 15 to 20% (ranging from ) and that  emissions fell from  compared to the similar model with a gasoline engine.

Fuji Heavy Industries (FHI) spent three years starting in fall 2005 developing the EE20 after concluding the marque needed a diesel engine to compete in Europe. Details about the engine were first released in February 2008, after an additional preview at Frankfurt in 2007, and an official announcement of applications was made at Geneva in March 2008.

The EE20 was originally released with Euro-4 emissions compliance; an oxidation catalyst and diesel particulate filter are mounted close to the turbo, using heat from exhaust gases, and the exhaust gas recirculation system is water-cooled to meet regulations. The compliance was soon updated to Euro-5 and Euro-6 in 2015.

Availability
Per the March 2008 announcement at Geneva, the EE20 was sold in Legacy (wagon and sedan) and Outback vehicles for the European market; the diesel was only offered with a manual transmission at first, and the clutch and flywheel were specifically modified for diesel use. In September 2008, FHI announced the EE20 would be available as a slightly modified variant (the diesel particulate filter was now closed) in Forester and Impreza models sold in Europe starting that fall.

The EE20 was offered with the Impreza XV at that model's launch in 2010. The Subaru continuously variable transmission (branded Lineartronic) was offered as an option for EE20-equipped Outback models starting in 2013, and sales of the Lineartronic EE20 Outback would start in Australia later in 2013. At Geneva 2013, the diesel boxer was combined with three electric motors to form the hybrid powertrain of the Subaru VIZIV Concept. The Lineartronic EE20 powertrain was added to the Forester in 2015.

In 2016, citing increasingly stringent emissions standards, the project manager for the Impreza stated that further development of the EE20 had been halted. In September 2017, Subaru announced production of diesel automobiles would end by 2020; at the time, sales were approximately 15,000 diesel-powered cars annually in Europe and Australia. The capacity gained would be used to start producing plug-in hybrids in 2018 and electric vehicles by 2021. At Geneva in March 2018, Subaru UK confirmed its parent company's plans to discontinue diesel production, but had enough stock on hand to meet projected demand through the end of 2018.

Subaru EJ engine
The EJ engine was introduced in the 1989 Subaru Legacy to replace the EA engines. It was designed from scratch with five main crankshaft bearings and four valves per cylinder and can be either SOHC or DOHC and one timing belt. The fifth digit is the only way to tell without seeing the engine.

 EJ15: 1483.4 cc SOHC, 1990–2003 JDM Subaru Impreza  
 EJ16: 90 hp at 5,600 rpm used in the 1993–2006 Subaru Impreza
 EJ18: 1820 cc SOHC 110 hp at 5,600 rpm used in the 1993–1996 Subaru Impreza and Euro and JDM Subaru Legacy
 EJ20: 1994.3 cc, available in Australia, Europe and Japan naturally aspirated at 115–190 hp and with a Turbo 220–280 hp used on Most Models, (2002–2005 WRX in the United States)
 EJ22: 2212 cc, 135–280 hp used in the 1989–2001 Subaru Impreza and Subaru Legacy
 EJ25: 2457 cc, 165–320 hp found in Most Models 1995–Present
 EJ30: Special limited engine.  Four were built by Subaru, but only 3 remain in working condition.  There is no readily available technical or power information on these engines.

Generally the EJ-series can be divided into two versions: the Phase I engines (1989–1998) and the Phase II engines (1999–2010). The Phase II engines featured new cylinder heads and crankshafts with the thrust bearing located at crank bearing #5 instead of #3. The designation also changed from Phase I to Phase II. All Phase I engines have an alphanumerical suffix behind the standard EJXX designation, all Phase II engines have a numerical suffix behind the EJXX designation. Example:

Phase I:
EJ15E, EJ15J, EJ16E, EJ18E, EJ20D, EJ20E, EJ20G, EJ20H, EJ20J, EJ20R, EJ20K, EJ22E, EJ221, EJ25D

Phase II:
EJ151, EJ161, EJ181, EJ201, EJ202, EJ203, EJ204, EJ205, EJ206, EJ207, EJ208, EJ222, EJ251, EJ252, EJ253, EJ254, EJ255, EJ257, EJ20X, EJ20Y

There's at least 3 exceptions from this rule - MY'07 EJ20F engine. Most likely F stands for bi-Fuel (engines prepared for LPG). This engine model has reinforced engine valves. This is unconfirmed info, based only on users' experience and observations. JDM Legacy GT EJ20X and EJ20Y engines are also exceptions.

Subaru EL engine/Boxer type 3
The replaced the EJ15 and is used in the JDM Subaru Impreza 1.5R (series GD, GG, GE, GH) starting with model year 2006. It is based on the EJ engine and shares many components, like the crankshaft from the EJ25. It has DOHC cylinder heads with AVCS variable valve timing on the intake.

Displacement: 1,498 cc
bore x stroke: 77.7 x 79 mm
compression ratio: 10.1
maximum horsepower: 110ps (81 kW) at 6,400 RPM
maximum torque: 14.7kgm (144Nm) at 3,200 rpm
AVCS

Subaru EN engine
The Subaru EN inline-four engine was introduced in 1988 to replace the straight-two EK series engine that was originally engineered as an air-cooled engine, then modified as a water-cooled engine used in the 1969–1972 Subaru R-2. The EN was used in all kei cars and kei trucks in production by Subaru up until 2012.

Subaru FA engine

() The FA was developed from the FB engine, however, efforts to reduce weight while maintaining durability were the main goals of the FA engine. While the FA and FB engines share a common platform, the FA shares very little in dedicated parts with the FB engine, with a different block, head, connecting rods, and pistons.

FA20D: 1,998 cc DOHC, aka Toyota 4U-GSE; 2013-21 Subaru BRZ/Toyota 86
FA20F: 1,998 cc DOHC, turbo, 2012+ JDM Subaru Legacy 2.0GT DIT and 2014+ Subaru Levorg; 2014+ USDM and JDM Subaru Forester XT; 2015-20 USDM Subaru WRX
FA24D: 2,387 cc DOHC, 2022+ Subaru BRZ/Toyota 86
FA24F: 2,387 cc DOHC, turbo, 2019+ USDM Subaru Ascent, 2020+ Subaru Legacy, and 2020+ Subaru Outback. 2021+ USDM Subaru WRX

Subaru FB engine

The FB-series (initially available as naturally-aspirated engines in 2.5 and 2.0 litre displacements) is the first new generation of boxer engine since the EJ-series. Subaru announced details of the FB engine on 23 September 2010. By increasing piston stroke and decreasing piston bore, Subaru aimed to reduce emissions and improve fuel economy, while increasing and broadening torque output over the previous generation engine.

The FB has an all new block and head featuring dual overhead cams with intake and exhaust variable valve timing (AVCS - Active Valve Control System), and a timing chain that replaced the timing belt. Moving to chain-driven cams allows the valves to be placed at a more narrow angle to each other and shrinks the cylinder bore from 99.5 mm to 94. It results in less unburned fuel during cold start, thereby reducing emissions. Subaru also uses asymmetrical connecting rods like those in EZ36. The FB is only marginally heavier and has similar exterior dimensions compared to an EJ engine of equivalent displacement. In Jan 2011, Car and Driver was told direct injection would be added soon.  In 2019, Direct Injection was added to FB engines used in the 2019 Crosstrek, 2019 Forester and the 2020 Legacy and Outback models.

Subaru claims a 28-percent reduction in friction losses, mainly due to lighter pistons and connecting rods. The FB has a 10% improvement in fuel economy with the power coming on sooner and the torque band being broader.

 FB16E: 1600 cc DOHC, 2012+ EUDM Subaru Impreza XV 1.6i
 FB16F: 1600 cc DOHC, turbo, 2014–20 Subaru Levorg
 FB20B: 1995 cc DOHC, 2011+ JDM Subaru Forester, 2012-2016 Subaru Impreza, and 2012-2017 Subaru XV
 FB20D: 1995 cc DOHC, 2017+ Subaru Impreza, and 2018+ Subaru XV
 FB20X: 1995 cc DOHC, 2014–16 Subaru XV Hybrid
 FB20V: 1995 cc DOHC, 2019+ Subaru XV Hybrid
 FB25B: 2498 cc DOHC, 2011–18 North American Subaru Forester, 2013-2019 North American Subaru Legacy, and 2013-2019 North American Subaru Outback
 FB25D: 2498 cc DOHC, 2019+ North American Subaru Forester, 2020+ North American Subaru Legacy, 2020+ North American Subaru Outback, and 2021+ North American Subaru XV

Subaru CB engine

The CB engine was first introduced in 2020 with the second-generation Levorg. According to Subaru, CB stands for Concentration/Compact Boxer. The first engine in the series is designated CB18, a 1.8 litre dual overhead cam 16-valve engine featuring dual AVCS with gasoline direct injection and a turbocharger.

In addition, the CB16 achieves its peak torque at a lower engine speed. Overall thermal efficiency is 40% due to the adoption of lean-burn combustion with an excess air ratio (λ) of 2.

 CB18: 1795 cc DOHC, 2020 Subaru Levorg, 2021 Subaru Forester

Six-cylinder

All of Subaru's six-cylinder engines are of a liquid-cooled, Flat-6 four-stroke design.

Subaru ER engine 
()
Subaru introduced its first six-cylinder engine in its Subaru XT sports car.  This MPI SOHC 2-Valve engine was based on the EA82, with two cylinders added to the front.
 ER27: 2672 cc SOHC, 145 hp at 5,200 rpm found in the 1987–1991 Subaru XT

Subaru EG engine 
The engine was a direct replacement for the ER engine. The ER had been used only in the Subaru XT6, which was being replaced by the Subaru Alcyone SVX, and the company took the opportunity to create a new engine based on the more modern EJ rather than the EA engine series.  As the ER27 was to the EA82, Subaru took the EJ22 design and created a six-cylinder version to make the new EG33.  However, this four-valves-per-cylinder engine was DOHC, and valvetrain parts came from the not yet released EJ25D.
Bore: 96.9 mm Stroke: 75 mm
 EG33: 3318 cc DOHC, 230 hp at 5,400 rpm used in the 1992–1997 Subaru Alcyone SVX

Subaru EZ engine

The was introduced in 1999 in the Japanese market, in the Subaru Outback, and in 2000 in the United States market, also in the Outback. It is a flat-six, 24-valve, quad-cam engine with an aluminium block and heads. It is available in EZ30 and EZ36 variants. Though the second iteration of the EZ30D used from 2003 to 2009 was heavily updated from the early EZ30D used from 2001 to 2003, Subaru continued to identify it as EZ30D. "EZ30R" is a false engine code often used on the Internet for the later EZ30, but Subaru has never used it as an official engine code. All EZ-series engines use dual timing chains and feature coil-on-plug ignition.

The 2000-2003 EZ30D used one exhaust port per head, a cable-actuated throttle, variable intake geometry, and a cast aluminium intake manifold. It was only available with an automatic transmission.
Displacement: 2999 cc DOHC
Bore: 89.2 mm
Stroke: 80 mm
Compression: 10.7:1
Power:  at 6000 rpm
Torque:  at 4400 rpm
Application:
2000–2004 Subaru Outback H6
2002-2003 Subaru Legacy GT30
2000–2003 Subaru Legacy Lancaster 6
2002-2003 Subaru Legacy RS30

The 2003-2007 EZ30D received new cylinder heads with 3 exhaust ports per head, AVLS, AVCS on the intake cams only, a drive-by-wire throttle, and a plastic intake manifold. It was available in manual and automatic unlike the original EZ30D.

Displacement: 2999 cc DOHC
Bore: 89.2 mm
Stroke: 80 mm
Compression: 10.7:1
Power: @ 6,600 RPM
Torque: @ 4,200 RPM
Application:
2003–2009 Subaru Legacy 3.0R
2005–2009 Subaru Outback 3.0R
2006–2007 Tribeca

The EZ36D retains the plastic intake manifold, 3 exhaust ports per head, and drive-by-wire throttle of the later EZ30D, but loses AVLS while gaining AVCS for both intake and exhaust cams. The EZ36D also incorporates an asymmetrical connecting rod design shared with the FB series of engines and the EE20 diesel engine.

Displacement: 3629 cc DOHC
Bore: 92 mm
Stroke: 91 mm
Compression: 10.5:1
Power:  at 6000 rpm
Torque:  at 4400 rpm
Application:
2010-2019 Subaru Legacy
2010-2019 Subaru Outback
2008-2014 Subaru Tribeca

See also
Subaru Active Valve Control System
Subaru Active Valve Lift System
Subaru 1235
List of Subaru transmissions

Notes

External links

 Subaru

 
Boxer engines
Lists of automobile engines